The following is a list of the rove beetles recorded in Great Britain.  For other beetles, see List of beetle species recorded in Britain.

Acidota crenata (Fabricius, 1793)
Acidota cruentata Mannerheim, 1830
Anthobium atrocephalum (Gyllenhal, 1827)
Anthobium unicolor (Marsham, 1802)
Anthophagus alpinus (Paykull, 1790)
Anthophagus caraboides (Linnaeus, 1758)
Deliphrum tectum (Paykull, 1789)
Eucnecosum brachypterum (Gravenhorst, 1802)
Geodromicus longipes (Mannerheim, 1830)
Geodromicus nigrita (P. W. J. Müller, 1821)
Lesteva hanseni Lohse, 1953
Lesteva longoelytrata (Goeze, 1777)
Lesteva monticola Kiesenwetter, 1847
Lesteva pubescens Mannerheim, 1830
Lesteva punctata Erichson, 1839
Lesteva sicula Erichson, 1840
Olophrum assimile (Paykull, 1800)
Olophrum consimile (Gyllenhal, 1810)
Olophrum fuscum (Gravenhorst, 1806)
Olophrum piceum (Gyllenhal, 1810)
Orochares angustatus (Erichson, 1840)
Philorinum sordidum (Stephens, 1834)
Phyllodrepoidea crenata Ganglbauer, 1895
Coryphium angusticolle Stephens, 1834
Eudectus whitei Sharp, 1871
Eusphalerum luteum (Marsham, 1802)
Eusphalerum minutum (Fabricius, 1792)
Eusphalerum primulae (Stephens, 1834)
Eusphalerum sorbi (Gyllenhal, 1810)
Eusphalerum sorbicola (Kangas, 1941)
Eusphalerum torquatum (Marsham, 1802)
Hadrognathus longipalpis (Mulsant & Rey, 1851)
Acrolocha minuta (Olivier, 1795)
Acrolocha sulcula (Stephens, 1834)
Acrulia inflata (Gyllenhal, 1813)
Dropephylla devillei Bernhauer, 1902
Dropephylla gracilicornis (Fairmaire & Laboulbène, 1856)
Dropephylla heerii (Heer, 1841)
Dropephylla ioptera (Stephens, 1832)
Dropephylla koltzei Jászay & Hlavac, 2006
Dropephylla vilis (Erichson, 1840)
Hapalaraea pygmaea (Paykull, 1800)
Hypopycna rufula (Erichson, 1840)
Micralymma marinum (Ström, 1783)
Omalium allardi Fairmaire & Brisout, 1859
Omalium caesum Gravenhorst, 1806
Omalium excavatum Stephens, 1834
Omalium exiguum Gyllenhal, 1810
Omalium italicum Bernhauer, 1902
Omalium laeviusculum Gyllenhal, 1827
Omalium laticolle Kraatz, 1858
Omalium oxyacanthae Gravenhorst, 1806
Omalium riparium C. G. Thomson, 1857
Omalium rivulare (Paykull, 1789)
Omalium rugatum Mulsant & Rey, 1880
Omalium rugulipenne Rye, 1864
Omalium septentrionis C. G. Thomson, 1856
Paraphloeostiba gayndahensis (Macleay, 1873)
Phloeonomus punctipennis C. G. Thomson, 1867
Phloeonomus pusillus (Gravenhorst, 1806)
Phloeostiba lapponica (Zetterstedt, 1838)
Phloeostiba plana (Paykull, 1792)
Phyllodrepa floralis (Paykull, 1789)
Phyllodrepa nigra (Gravenhorst, 1806)
Phyllodrepa puberula Bernhauer, 1903
Phyllodrepa salicis (Gyllenhal, 1810)
Xylodromus concinnus (Marsham, 1802)
Xylodromus depressus (Gravenhorst, 1802)
Xylodromus testaceus (Erichson, 1840)
Xylostiba bosnica (Bernhauer, 1902)
Xylostiba monilicornis (Gyllenhal, 1810)
Megarthrus bellevoyei (Saulcy, 1862)
Megarthrus denticollis (Beck, 1817)
Megarthrus depressus (Paykull, 1789)
Megarthrus hemipterus (Illiger, 1794)
Megarthrus prosseni Schatzmayr, 1904
Metopsia clypeata (P. W. J. Müller, 1821)
Proteinus atomarius Erichson, 1840
Proteinus brachypterus (Fabricius, 1792)
Proteinus crenulatus Pandellé, 1867
Proteinus laevigatus Hochhuth, 1871
Proteinus ovalis Stephens, 1834
Arrhenopeplus tesserula (Curtis, 1828)
Micropeplus caelatus Erichson, 1839
Micropeplus fulvus Erichson, 1840
Micropeplus porcatus (Paykull, 1789)
Micropeplus staphylinoides (Marsham, 1802)
Batrisodes adnexus (Hampe, 1863)
Batrisodes delaporti (Aubé, 1833)
Batrisodes venustus (Reichenbach, 1816)
Claviger longicornis P. W. J. Müller, 1818
Claviger testaceus Preyssler, 1790
Euplectus bescidicus Reitter, 1881
Euplectus bonvouloiri Reitter, 1881
Euplectus rosae Raffray, 1910
Euplectus brunneus (Grimmer, 1841)
Euplectus decipiens Raffray, 1910
Euplectus duponti Aubé, 1833
Euplectus infirmus Raffray, 1910
Euplectus karstenii (Reichenbach, 1816)
Euplectus kirbii Denny, 1825
Euplectus mutator Fauvel, 1895
Euplectus nanus (Reichenbach, 1816)
Euplectus piceus Motschulsky, 1835
Euplectus punctatus Mulsant, 1861
Euplectus sanguineus Denny, 1825
Euplectus signatus (Reichenbach, 1816)
Euplectus tholini Guillebeau, 1888
Plectophloeus erichsoni (Aubé, 1844)
Plectophloeus occidentalis Besuchet, 1969
Plectophloeus nitidus (Fairmaire, 1857)
Bibloporus bicolor (Denny, 1825)
Bibloporus minutus Raffray, 1914
Bibloplectus ambiguus (Reichenbach, 1816)
Bibloplectus delhermi Guillebeau, 1888
Bibloplectus minutissimus (Aubé, 1833)
Bibloplectus pusillus (Denny, 1825)
Bibloplectus spinosus Raffray, 1914
Bibloplectus tenebrosus (Reitter, 1880)
Amauronyx maerkelii (Aubé, 1844)
Trichonyx sulcicollis (Reichenbach, 1816)
Trimium brevicorne (Reichenbach, 1816)
Brachygluta fossulata (Reichenbach, 1816)
Brachygluta haematica (Reichenbach, 1816)
Brachygluta helferi (Schmidt-Göbel, 1836)
Brachygluta pandellei (Saulcy, 1876)
Brachygluta simplicior Raffray, 1904
Brachygluta sinuata (Aubé, 1833)
Brachygluta waterhousei (Rye, 1869)
Fagniezia impressa (Panzer, 1803)
Reichenbachia juncorum (Leach, 1817)
Rybaxis longicornis (Leach, 1817)
Bryaxis bulbifer (Reichenbach, 1816)
Bryaxis curtisii (Leach, 1817)
Bryaxis puncticollis (Denny, 1825)
Bythinus burrellii Denny, 1825
Bythinus macropalpus Aubé, 1833
Tychobythinus glabratus (Rye, 1870)
Tychus niger (Paykull, 1800)
Tychus striola Guillebeau, 1888
Pselaphaulax dresdensis (Herbst, 1792)
Pselaphus heisei Herbst, 1792
Phloeocharis subtilissima Mannerheim, 1830
Bolitobius castaneus (Stephens, 1832)
Bolitobius cingulatus (Mannerheim, 1830)
Bryophacis crassicornis (Mäklin, 1847)
Bryophacis rugipennis (Pandellé, 1869)
Bryoporus cernuus (Gravenhorst, 1806)
Ischnosoma longicorne (Mäklin, 1847)
Ischnosoma splendidum (Gravenhorst, 1806)
Lordithon exoletus (Erichson, 1839)
Lordithon lunulatus (Linnaeus, 1761)
Lordithon thoracicus (Fabricius, 1777)
Lordithon trinotatus (Erichson, 1839)
Mycetoporus angularis Mulsant & Rey, 1853
Mycetoporus baudueri Mulsant & Rey, 1875
Mycetoporus bimaculatus Boisduval & Lacordaire, 1835
Mycetoporus clavicornis (Stephens, 1832)
Mycetoporus despectus A. Strand, 1969
Mycetoporus erichsonanus Fagel, 1965
Mycetoporus lepidus (Gravenhorst, 1806)
Mycetoporus longulus Mannerheim, 1830
Mycetoporus monticola Fowler, 1888
Mycetoporus nigricollis Stephens, 1835
Mycetoporus piceolus Rey, 1883
Mycetoporus punctus (Gravenhorst, 1806)
Mycetoporus rufescens (Stephens, 1832)
Parabolitobius inclinans (Gravenhorst, 1806)
Cilea silphoides (Linnaeus, 1767)
Lamprinodes saginatus (Gravenhorst, 1806)
Sepedophilus bipunctatus (Gravenhorst, 1802)
Sepedophilus constans (Fowler, 1888)
Sepedophilus immaculatus (Stephens, 1832)
Sepedophilus littoreus (Linnaeus, 1758)
Sepedophilus lusitanicus Hammond, 1973
Sepedophilus marshami (Stephens, 1832)
Sepedophilus nigripennis (Stephens, 1832)
Sepedophilus pedicularius (Gravenhorst, 1802)
Sepedophilus testaceus (Fabricius, 1793)
Tachinus bipustulatus (Fabricius, 1793)
Tachinus corticinus Gravenhorst, 1802
Tachinus elongatus Gyllenhal, 1810
Tachinus flavolimbatus Pandellé, 1869
Tachinus humeralis Gravenhorst, 1802
Tachinus laticollis Gravenhorst, 1802
Tachinus lignorum (Linnaeus, 1758)
Tachinus marginellus (Fabricius, 1781)
Tachinus pallipes (Gravenhorst, 1806)
Tachinus proximus Kraatz, 1855
Tachinus rufipennis Gyllenhal, 1810
Tachinus rufipes (Linnaeus, 1758)
Tachinus scapularis Stephens, 1832
Tachinus subterraneus (Linnaeus, 1758)
Tachyporus atriceps Stephens, 1832
Tachyporus chrysomelinus (Linnaeus, 1758)
Tachyporus dispar (Paykull, 1789)
Tachyporus formosus A. H. Matthews, 1838
Tachyporus hypnorum (Fabricius, 1775)
Tachyporus nitidulus (Fabricius, 1781)
Tachyporus obtusus (Linnaeus, 1767)
Tachyporus pallidus Sharp, 1871
Tachyporus pusillus Gravenhorst, 1806
Tachyporus quadriscopulatus Pandellé, 1869
Tachyporus scitulus Erichson, 1839
Tachyporus solutus Erichson, 1839
Tachyporus tersus Erichson, 1839
Tachyporus transversalis Gravenhorst, 1806
Trichophya pilicornis (Gyllenhal, 1810)
Habrocerus capillaricornis (Gravenhorst, 1806)
Actocharis readingii Sharp, 1870
Aleochara brevipennis Gravenhorst, 1806
Aleochara curtula (Goeze, 1777)
Aleochara lata Gravenhorst, 1802
Aleochara intricata Mannerheim, 1830
Aleochara ruficornis Gravenhorst, 1802
Aleochara bilineata Gyllenhal, 1810
Aleochara binotata Kraatz, 1858
Aleochara bipustulata (Linnaeus, 1761)
Aleochara verna Say, 1836
Aleochara obscurella Gravenhorst, 1806
Aleochara phycophila Allen, 1937
Aleochara grisea Kraatz, 1856
Aleochara punctatella Motschulsky, 1858
Aleochara spadicea (Erichson, 1837)
Aleochara cuniculorum Kraatz, 1858
Aleochara discipennis Mulsant & Rey, 1853
Aleochara fumata Gravenhorst, 1802
Aleochara funebris Wollaston, 1864
Aleochara inconspicua Aubé, 1850
Aleochara kamila Likovský, 1984
Aleochara lanuginosa Gravenhorst, 1802
Aleochara lygaea Kraatz, 1862
Aleochara maculata Brisout, 1863
Aleochara moerens Gyllenhal, 1827
Aleochara moesta Gravenhorst, 1802
Aleochara sanguinea (Linnaeus, 1758)
Aleochara sparsa Heer, 1839
Aleochara stichai Likovský, 1965
Aleochara tristis Gravenhorst, 1806
Aleochara villosa Mannerheim, 1830
Tinotus morion (Gravenhorst, 1802)
Acrotona aterrima (Gravenhorst, 1802)
Acrotona benicki (Allen, 1940)
Acrotona exigua (Erichson, 1837)
Acrotona muscorum (Brisout, 1860)
Acrotona obfuscata (Gravenhorst, 1802)
Acrotona parens (Mulsant & Rey, 1852)
Acrotona parvula (Mannerheim, 1830)
Acrotona pseudotenera (Cameron, 1933)
Acrotona pygmaea (Gravenhorst, 1802)
Acrotona sylvicola (Kraatz, 1856)
Acrotona troglodytes (Motschulsky, 1858)
Adota maritima (Mannerheim, 1843)
Alaobia gagatina (Baudi, 1848)
Alaobia hybrida (Sharp, 1869)
Alaobia linderi (Brisout, 1863)
Alaobia pallidicornis (C. G. Thomson, 1856)
Alaobia scapularis (C. R. Sahlberg, 1831)
Alaobia sodalis (Erichson, 1837)
Alaobia subglabra (Sharp, 1869)
Alaobia taxiceroides Munster, 1932
Alaobia trinotata (Kraatz, 1856)
Alevonota aurantiaca Fauvel, 1895
Alevonota egregia (Rye, 1876)
Alevonota gracilenta (Erichson, 1839)
Alevonota rufotestacea (Kraatz, 1856)
Alianta incana (Erichson, 1837)
Aloconota cambrica (Wollaston, 1855)
Aloconota currax (Kraatz, 1856)
Aloconota eichhoffi (Scriba, 1867)
Aloconota gregaria (Erichson, 1839)
Aloconota insecta (C. G. Thomson, 1856)
Aloconota mihoki Bernhauer, 1913
Aloconota planifrons (G. R. Waterhouse, 1864)
Aloconota subgrandis Brundin, 1954
Aloconota sulcifrons (Stephens, 1832)
Aloconota coulsoni (Last, 1952)
Aloconota languida (Erichson, 1837)
Aloconota longicollis (Mulsant & Rey, 1852)
Amidobia talpa (Heer, 1841)
Amischa analis (Gravenhorst, 1802)
Amischa bifoveolata (Mannerheim, 1830)
Amischa decipiens (Sharp, 1869)
Amischa forcipata Mulsant & Rey, 1873
Amischa nigrofusca (Stephens, 1829)
Anopleta corvina (C. G. Thomson, 1856)
Anopleta kochi (Roubal, 1937)
Anopleta puberula (Sharp, 1869)
Anopleta soedermani (Bernhauer, 1931)
Atheta aeneicollis (Sharp, 1869)
Atheta aquatica (C. G. Thomson, 1852)
Atheta aquatilis (C. G. Thomson, 1867)
Atheta brunneipennis (C. G. Thomson, 1852)
Atheta castanoptera (Mannerheim, 1830)
Atheta ebenina (Mulsant & Rey, 1874)
Atheta graminicola (Gravenhorst, 1806)
Atheta heymesi Hubenthal, 1913
Atheta hypnorum (Kiesenwetter, 1850)
Atheta incognita (Sharp, 1869)
Atheta laevicauda J. Sahlberg, 1876
Atheta triangulum (Kraatz, 1856)
Atheta xanthopus (C. G. Thomson, 1856)
Atheta autumnalis (Erichson, 1839)
Atheta basicornis (Mulsant & Rey, 1852)
Atheta boletophila (C. G. Thomson, 1856)
Atheta britanniae (Bernhauer & Scheerpeltz, 1926)
Atheta crassicornis (Fabricius, 1793)
Atheta diversa (Sharp, 1869)
Atheta divisa (Märkel, 1844)
Atheta euryptera (Stephens, 1832)
Atheta fungicola (C. G. Thomson, 1852)
Atheta harwoodi (Williams, 1930)
Atheta intermedia (C. G. Thomson, 1852)
Atheta liturata (Stephens, 1832)
Atheta nidicola (Johansen, 1914)
Atheta nigritula (Gravenhorst, 1802)
Atheta oblita (Erichson, 1839)
Atheta paracrassicornis Brundin, 1954
Atheta pilicornis (C. G. Thomson, 1852)
Atheta procera (Kraatz, 1856)
Atheta ravilla (Erichson, 1839)
Atheta strandiella (Brundin, 1954)
Atheta vaga (Heer, 1839)
Badura macrocera (C. G. Thomson, 1856)
Badura puncticollis (Benick, 1938)
Bessobia excellens (Kraatz, 1856)
Bessobia fungivora (C. G. Thomson, 1867)
Bessobia monticola (C. G. Thomson, 1852)
Bessobia occulta (Erichson, 1837)
Boreophilia eremita (Rye, 1866)
Brundinia marina (Mulsant & Rey, 1853)
Brundinia meridionalis (Mulsant & Rey, 1853)
Cadaverota cadaverina (Brisout, 1860)
Cadaverota hansseni (Strand, 1943)
Callicerus obscurus Gravenhorst, 1802
Callicerus rigidicornis (Erichson, 1839)
Ceritaxa dilaticornis (Kraatz, 1856)
Ceritaxa pervagata (Benick, 1974)
Ceritaxa testaceipes (Heer, 1839)
Chaetida longicornis (Gravenhorst, 1802)
Coprothassa melanaria (Mannerheim, 1830)
Dadobia immersa (Erichson, 1837)
Dalotia coriaria (Kraatz, 1856)
Datomicra canescens (Sharp, 1869)
Datomicra celata (Erichson, 1837)
Datomicra dadopora (C. G. Thomson, 1867)
Datomicra nigra (Kraatz, 1856)
Datomicra sordidula (Erichson, 1837)
Datomicra zosterae (C. G. Thomson, 1856)
Dilacra luteipes (Erichson, 1837)
Dilacra vilis (Erichson, 1837)
Dimetrota aeneipennis (C. G. Thomson, 1856)
Dimetrota atramentaria (Gyllenhal, 1810)
Dimetrota cauta (Erichson, 1837)
Dimetrota cinnamoptera (C. G. Thomson, 1856)
Dimetrota ischnocera (C. G. Thomson, 1870)
Dimetrota laevana (Mulsant & Rey, 1852)
Dimetrota marcida (Erichson, 1837)
Dimetrota nigripes (C. G. Thomson, 1856)
Dimetrota setigera (Sharp, 1869)
Dinaraea aequata (Erichson, 1837)
Dinaraea angustula (Gyllenhal, 1810)
Dinaraea linearis (Gravenhorst, 1802)
Dochmonota clancula (Erichson, 1837)
Enalodroma hepatica (Erichson, 1839)
Geostiba circellaris (Gravenhorst, 1806)
Halobrecta algae (Hardy, 1851)
Halobrecta algophila (Fenyes, 1909)
Halobrecta flavipes C. G. Thomson, 1861
Halobrecta princeps (Sharp, 1869)
Hydrosmecta delicatissima (Bernhauer, 1908)
Hydrosmecta delicatula (Sharp, 1869)
Hydrosmecta eximia (Sharp, 1869)
Hydrosmecta fragilis (Kraatz, 1854)
Hydrosmecta longula (Heer, 1839)
Hydrosmecta subtilissima (Kraatz, 1854)
Liogluta alpestris (Heer, 1839)
Liogluta granigera (Kiesenwetter, 1850)
Liogluta longiuscula (Gravenhorst, 1802)
Liogluta microptera C. G. Thomson, 1867
Liogluta pagana (Erichson, 1839)
Lyprocorrhe anceps (Erichson, 1837)
Microdota aegra (Heer, 1841)
Microdota amicula (Stephens, 1832)
Microdota atomaria (Kraatz, 1856)
Microdota atricolor (Sharp, 1869)
Microdota benickiella (Brundin, 1948)
Microdota boreella (Brundin, 1948)
Microdota excelsa (Bernhauer, 1911)
Microdota glabricula (C. G. Thomson, 1867)
Microdota indubia (Sharp, 1869)
Microdota inquinula (Gravenhorst, 1802)
Microdota liliputana (Brisout, 1860)
Microdota minuscula (Brisout, 1860)
Microdota palleola (Erichson, 1837)
Microdota spatuloides (Benick, 1939)
Microdota subtilis (Scriba, 1866)
Mocyta amplicollis (Mulsant & Rey, 1873)
Mocyta clientula (Erichson, 1839)
Mocyta fungi (Gravenhorst, 1806)
Mocyta fussi (Bernhauer, 1908)
Mocyta orbata (Erichson, 1837)
Mocyta orphana (Erichson, 1837)
Mycetota fimorum (Brisout, 1860)
Mycetota laticollis (Stephens, 1832)
Nehemitropia lividipennis (Mannerheim, 1830)
Neohilara subterranea (Mulsant & Rey, 1853)
Notothecta confusa (Märkel, 1844)
Notothecta flavipes (Gravenhorst, 1806)
Oreostiba tibialis (Heer, 1839)
Ousipalia caesula (Erichson, 1839)
Pachnida nigella (Erichson, 1837)
Pachyatheta cribrata (Kraatz, 1856)
Pachyatheta mortuorum (C. G. Thomson, 1867)
Parameotica difficilis (Brisout, 1860)
Paranopleta inhabilis (Kraatz, 1856)
Philhygra arctica (C. G. Thomson, 1856)
Philhygra britteni Joy, 1913
Philhygra debilis (Erichson, 1837)
Philhygra deformis (Kraatz, 1856)
Philhygra elongatula (Gravenhorst, 1802)
Philhygra fallaciosa (Sharp, 1869)
Philhygra gyllenhalii (C. G. Thomson, 1856)
Philhygra hygrobia (C. G. Thomson, 1856)
Philhygra hygrotopora (Kraatz, 1856)
Philhygra luridipennis (Mannerheim, 1830)
Philhygra malleus (Joy, 1913)
Philhygra melanocera (C. G. Thomson, ?
Philhygra obtusangula (Joy, 1913)
Philhygra palustris (Kiesenwetter, 1844)
Philhygra parca (Mulsant & Rey, 1873)
Philhygra scotica (Elliman, 1909)
Philhygra terminalis (Gravenhorst, 1806)
Philhygra volans (Scriba, 1859)
Plataraea brunnea (Fabricius, 1798)
Pycnota paradoxa (Mulsant & Rey, 1861)
Rhagocneme subsinuata (Erichson, 1839)
Schistoglossa aubei (Brisout, 1860)
Schistoglossa bergvalli Palm, 1968
Schistoglossa curtipennis (Sharp, 1869)
Schistoglossa gemina (Erichson, 1837)
Schistoglossa viduata (Erichson, 1837)
Thinobaena vestita (Gravenhorst, 1806)
Traumoecia picipes (C. G. Thomson, ?
Trichiusa immigrata Lohse, 1984
Xenota myrmecobia (Kraatz, 1856)
Thamiaraea cinnamomea (Gravenhorst, 1802)
Thamiaraea hospita (Märkel, 1844)
Autalia impressa (Olivier, 1795)
Autalia longicornis Scheerpeltz, 1947
Autalia puncticollis Sharp, 1864
Autalia rivularis (Gravenhorst, 1802)
Deinopsis erosa (Stephens, 1832)
Diglotta mersa (Haliday, 1837)
Diglotta sinuaticollis (Mulsant & Rey, 1871)
Bohemiellina flavipennis (Cameron, 1920)
Borboropora kraatzii Fuss in Kraatz & Fuss, 1862
Cordalia obscura (Gravenhorst, 1802)
Falagria caesa Erichson, 1837
Falagria sulcatula (Gravenhorst, 1806)
Falagrioma thoracica (Stephens, 1832)
Myrmecocephalus concinnus (Erichson, 1839)
Myrmecopora brevipes Butler, 1909
Myrmecopora oweni Assing, 1997
Myrmecopora sulcata (Kiesenwetter, 1850)
Myrmecopora uvida (Erichson, 1840)
Gymnusa brevicollis (Paykull, 1800)
Gymnusa variegata Kiesenwetter, 1845
Bolitochara bella Märkel, 1844
Bolitochara lucida (Gravenhorst, 1802)
Bolitochara mulsanti Sharp, 1875
Bolitochara obliqua Erichson, 1837
Bolitochara pulchra (Gravenhorst, 1806)
Euryusa optabilis Heer, 1839
Euryusa sinuata Erichson, 1837
Leptusa fumida (Erichson, 1839)
Leptusa norvegica A. Strand, 1941
Leptusa pulchella (Mannerheim, 1830)
Leptusa ruficollis (Erichson, 1839)
Heterota plumbea (G. R. Waterhouse, 1858)
Pseudomicrodota paganettii (Bernhauer, 1909)
Pseudopasilia testacea (Brisout, 1863)
Rhopalocerina clavigera (Scriba, 1859)
Tachyusida gracilis (Erichson, 1837)
Thecturota marchii (Dodero, 1922)
Thecturota williamsi (Bernhauer, 1936)
Agaricochara latissima (Stephens, 1832)
Brachida exigua (Heer, 1839)
Encephalus complicans Stephens, 1832
Gyrophaena affinis Mannerheim, 1830
Gyrophaena bihamata C. G. Thomson, 1867
Gyrophaena congrua Erichson, 1837
Gyrophaena fasciata (Marsham, 1802)
Gyrophaena gentilis Erichson, 1839
Gyrophaena hanseni A. Strand, 1946
Gyrophaena joyi Wendeler, 1924
Gyrophaena joyioides Wüsthoff, 1937
Gyrophaena lucidula Erichson, 1837
Gyrophaena manca Erichson, 1839
Gyrophaena minima Erichson, 1837
Gyrophaena munsteri A. Strand, 1935
Gyrophaena nana (Paykull, 1800)
Gyrophaena poweri Crotch, 1867
Gyrophaena pseudonana A. Strand, 1939
Gyrophaena pulchella Heer, 1839
Gyrophaena rousi Dvorák, 1966
Gyrophaena strictula Erichson, 1839
Gyrophaena williamsi A. Strand, 1935
Anomognathus cuspidatus (Erichson, 1839)
Cyphea curtula (Erichson, 1837)
Homalota plana (Gyllenhal, 1810)
Silusa rubiginosa Erichson, 1837
Hygronoma dimidiata (Gravenhorst, 1806)
Cypha apicalis (Brisout, 1863)
Cypha aprilis (Rey, 1882)
Cypha discoidea (Erichson, 1839)
Cypha laeviuscula (Mannerheim, 1830)
Cypha longicornis (Paykull, 1800)
Cypha pulicaria (Erichson, 1839)
Cypha punctum (Motschulsky, 1857)
Cypha seminulum (Erichson, 1839)
Cypha tarsalis (Luze, 1902)
Holobus flavicornis (Lacordaire, 1835)
Oligota apicata (Erichson, 1837)
Oligota granaria Erichson, 1837
Oligota inflata (Mannerheim, 1830)
Oligota parva Kraatz, 1862
Oligota picipes (Stephens, 1832)
Oligota pumilio Kiesenwetter, 1858
Oligota punctulata Heer, 1839
Oligota pusillima (Gravenhorst, 1806)
Lomechusa emarginata (Paykull, 1789)
Lomechusa paradoxa Gravenhorst, 1806
Lomechusoides strumosus (Fabricius, 1775)
Drusilla canaliculata (Fabricius, 1787)
Myrmoecia plicata (Erichson, 1837)
Pella cognata (Märkel, 1842)
Pella funesta (Gravenhorst, 1806)
Pella humeralis (Gravenhorst, 1802)
Pella laticollis (Märkel, 1845)
Pella limbata (Paykull, 1789)
Pella lugens (Gravenhorst, 1802)
Zyras collaris (Märkel, 1842)
Zyras haworthi Stephens, 1835
Myllaena brevicornis (A. H. Matthews, 1838)
Myllaena dubia (Gravenhorst, 1806)
Myllaena elongata (A. H. Matthews, 1838)
Myllaena fowleri A. Matthews, 1883
Myllaena gracilicornis Fairmaire & Brisout, 1859
Myllaena gracilis (A. H. Matthews, 1838)
Myllaena infuscata Kraatz, 1853
Myllaena intermedia Erichson, 1837
Myllaena kraatzi Sharp, 1871
Myllaena masoni A. Matthews, 1883
Myllaena minuta (Gravenhorst, 1806)
Dinarda dentata (Gravenhorst, 1806)
Dinarda hagensi Wasmann, 1889
Dinarda maerkeli Kiesenwetter, 1843
Dinarda pygmaea Wasmann, 1894
Homoeusa acuminata (Märkel, 1842)
Meotica anglica Benick in Muona, 1991
Meotica exilis (Knoch in Gravenhorst, 1806)
Meotica exillima Sharp, 1915
Meotica filiformis (Motschulsky, 1860)
Meotica pallens (Redtenbacher, 1849)
Amarochara bonnairei (Fauvel, 1865)
Amarochara forticornis (Boisduval & Lacordaire, 1835)
Amarochara umbrosa (Erichson, 1837)
Calodera aethiops (Gravenhorst, 1802)
Calodera nigrita Mannerheim, 1830
Calodera protensa Mannerheim, 1830
Calodera riparia Erichson, 1837
Calodera rubens (Erichson, 1837)
Calodera rufescens Kraatz, 1856
Calodera uliginosa Erichson, 1837
Cousya defecta Mulsant & Rey, 1875
Cousya longitarsis (C. G. Thomson, 1867)
Cousya nigrata (Fairmaire & Laboulbène, 1856)
Cousya nitidiventris (Fagel, 1958)
Crataraea suturalis (Mannerheim, 1830)
Dexiogyia corticina (Erichson, 1837)
Haploglossa gentilis (Märkel, 1844)
Haploglossa marginalis (Gravenhorst, 1806)
Haploglossa nidicola (Fairmaire, 1852)
Haploglossa picipennis (Gyllenhal, 1827)
Haploglossa villosula (Stephens, 1832)
Hygropora cunctans (Erichson, 1837)
Ilyobates bennetti Donisthorpe, 1914
Ilyobates nigricollis (Paykull, 1800)
Ilyobates propinquus (Aubé, 1850)
Ischnoglossa obscura Wunderle, 1990
Ischnoglossa prolixa (Gravenhorst, 1802)
Ischnoglossa turcica Wunderle, 1992
Mniusa incrassata (Mulsant & Rey, 1852)
Ocalea badia Erichson, 1837
Ocalea latipennis Sharp, 1870
Ocalea picata (Stephens, 1832)
Ocalea rivularis L. Miller, 1851
Ocyusa maura (Erichson, 1837)
Ocyusa picina (Aubé, 1850)
Oxypoda acuminata (Stephens, 1832)
Oxypoda alternans (Gravenhorst, 1802)
Oxypoda annularis Mannerheim, 1830
Oxypoda brachyptera (Stephens, 1832)
Oxypoda brevicornis (Stephens, 1832)
Oxypoda carbonaria (Heer, 1841)
Oxypoda elongatula Aubé, 1850
Oxypoda exoleta Erichson, 1839
Oxypoda ferruginea Erichson, 1839
Oxypoda flavicornis Kraatz, 1856
Oxypoda formiceticola Märkel, 1841
Oxypoda haemorrhoa (Mannerheim, 1830)
Oxypoda induta Mulsant & Rey, 1861
Oxypoda islandica Kraatz, 1857
Oxypoda lentula Erichson, 1837
Oxypoda longipes Mulsant & Rey, 1861
Oxypoda lurida Wollaston, 1857
Oxypoda mutata Sharp, 1871
Oxypoda nigricornis Motschulsky, 1860
Oxypoda nigrocincta Mulsant & Rey, 1875
Oxypoda opaca (Gravenhorst, 1802)
Oxypoda praecox Erichson, 1839
Oxypoda procerula Mannerheim, 1830
Oxypoda recondita Kraatz, 1856
Oxypoda soror C. G. Thomson, 1855
Oxypoda spectabilis Märkel, 1844
Oxypoda tarda Sharp, 1871
Oxypoda tirolensis Gredler, 1863
Oxypoda vittata Märkel, 1842
Phloeopora concolor Kraatz, 1856
Phloeopora corticalis (Gravenhorst, 1802)
Phloeopora nitidiventris Fauvel, 1904
Phloeopora scribae Eppelsheim, 1884
Phloeopora testacea (Mannerheim, 1830)
Stichoglossa semirufa (Erichson, 1839)
Tetralaucopora longitarsis (Erichson, 1837)
Tetralaucopora rubicunda (Erichson, 1837)
Thiasophila angulata (Erichson, 1837)
Thiasophila inquilina (Märkel, 1842)
Brachyusa concolor (Erichson, 1839)
Dacrila fallax (Kraatz, 1856)
Dacrila pruinosa (Kraatz, 1856)
Dasygnypeta velata (Erichson, 1837)
Gnypeta caerulea (C. R. Sahlberg, 1831)
Gnypeta carbonaria (Mannerheim, 1830)
Gnypeta ripicola (Kiesenwetter, 1844)
Gnypeta rubrior Tottenham, 1939
Ischnopoda leucopus (Marsham, 1802)
Ischnopoda scitula (Erichson, 1837)
Ischnopoda umbratica (Erichson, 1837)
Tachyusa coarctata (Erichson, 1837)
Tachyusa constricta (Erichson, 1837)
Tachyusa objecta (Mulsant & Rey, 1870)
Thinonoma atra (Gravenhorst, 1806)
Arena tabida (Kiesenwetter, 1850)
Phytosus balticus Kraatz, 1859
Phytosus nigriventris (Chevrolat, 1843)
Phytosus spinifer Curtis, 1838
Placusa complanata Erichson, 1839
Placusa depressa Mäklin, 1845
Placusa pumilio (Gravenhorst, 1802)
Placusa tachyporoides (Waltl, 1838)
Scaphidium quadrimaculatum Olivier, 1790
Scaphium immaculatum (Olivier, 1790)
Scaphisoma agaricinum (Linnaeus, 1758)
Scaphisoma assimile Erichson, 1845
Scaphisoma boleti (Panzer, 1793)
Siagonium quadricorne Kirby, 1815
Coprophilus striatulus (Fabricius, 1793)
Deleaster dichrous (Gravenhorst, 1802)
Syntomium aeneum (P. W. J. Müller, 1821)
Anotylus clypeonitens (Pandellé, 1867)
Anotylus complanatus (Erichson, 1839)
Anotylus fairmairei (Pandellé, 1867)
Anotylus hamatus (Fairmaire & Laboulbène, 1856)
Anotylus insecatus (Gravenhorst, 1806)
Anotylus inustus (Gravenhorst, 1806)
Anotylus maritimus C. G. Thomson, 1861
Anotylus mutator (Lohse, 1963)
Anotylus nitidulus (Gravenhorst, 1802)
Anotylus rugosus (Fabricius, 1775)
Anotylus saulcyi (Pandellé, 1867)
Anotylus sculpturatus (Gravenhorst, 1806)
Anotylus tetracarinatus (Block, 1799)
Oxytelus fulvipes Erichson, 1839
Oxytelus laqueatus (Marsham, 1802)
Oxytelus migrator Fauvel, 1904
Oxytelus piceus (Linnaeus, 1767)
Oxytelus sculptus Gravenhorst, 1806
Platystethus alutaceus C. G. Thomson, 1861
Platystethus capito Heer, 1839
Platystethus cornutus (Gravenhorst, 1802)
Platystethus degener Mulsant & Rey, 1878
Platystethus nitens (C. R. Sahlberg, 1832)
Platystethus nodifrons Mannerheim, 1830
Platystethus arenarius (Fourcroy, 1785)
Aploderus caelatus (Gravenhorst, 1802)
Bledius subterraneus Erichson, 1839
Bledius limicola Tottenham, 1940
Bledius spectabilis Kraatz, 1857
Bledius tricornis (Herbst, 1784)
Bledius unicornis (Germar, 1825)
Bledius fergussoni Joy, 1912
Bledius subniger Schneider, 1900
Bledius bicornis (Germar, 1822)
Bledius jutlandensis Herman, 1986
Bledius diota Schiødte, 1866
Bledius furcatus (Olivier, 1811)
Bledius annae Sharp, 1911
Bledius arcticus J. Sahlberg, 1890
Bledius atricapillus (Germar, 1825)
Bledius crassicollis Lacordaire, 1835
Bledius defensus Fauvel, 1872
Bledius dissimilis Erichson, 1840
Bledius erraticus Erichson, 1839
Bledius femoralis (Gyllenhal, 1827)
Bledius filipes Sharp, 1911
Bledius fuscipes Rye, 1865
Bledius gallicus (Gravenhorst, 1806)
Bledius longulus Erichson, 1839
Bledius occidentalis Bondroit, 1907
Bledius opacus (Block, 1799)
Bledius pallipes (Gravenhorst, 1806)
Bledius praetermissus Williams, 1929
Bledius terebrans (Schiødte, 1866)
Carpelimus bilineatus Stephens, 1834
Carpelimus corticinus (Gravenhorst, 1806)
Carpelimus despectus (Baudi, 1869)
Carpelimus elongatulus (Erichson, 1839)
Carpelimus foveolatus (C. R. Sahlberg, 1832)
Carpelimus fuliginosus (Gravenhorst, 1802)
Carpelimus gracilis (Mannerheim, 1830)
Carpelimus halophilus (Kiesenwetter, 1844)
Carpelimus impressus (Boisduval & Lacordaire, 1835)
Carpelimus lindrothi Palm, 1942
Carpelimus manchuricus (Bernhauer, 1938)
Carpelimus obesus (Kiesenwetter, 1844)
Carpelimus pusillus (Gravenhorst, 1802)
Carpelimus rivularis (Motschulsky, 1860)
Carpelimus schneideri (Ganglbauer, 1895)
Carpelimus similis Smetana, 1967
Carpelimus subtilis (Erichson, 1839)
Carpelimus zealandicus (Sharp, 1900)
Manda mandibularis (Gyllenhal, 1827)
Ochthephilus andalusiacus (Fagel, 1957)
Ochthephilus angustior (Bernhauer, 1943)
Ochthephilus aureus (Fauvel, 1871)
Ochthephilus omalinus (Erichson, 1840)
Planeustomus flavicollis Fauvel, 1871
Planeustomus palpalis (Erichson, 1839)
Teropalpus unicolor (Sharp, 1900)
Thinobius bicolor Joy, 1911
Thinobius brevipennis Kiesenwetter, 1850
Thinobius ciliatus Kiesenwetter, 1844
Thinobius crinifer Smetana, 1959
Thinobius longipennis (Heer, 1841)
Thinobius major Kraatz, 1857
Thinobius newberyi Scheerpeltz, 1925
Thinodromus arcuatus (Stephens, 1834)
Oxyporus rufus (Linnaeus, 1758)
Dianous coerulescens (Gyllenhal, 1810)
Stenus aceris Stephens, 1833
Stenus fuscicornis Erichson, 1840
Stenus geniculatus Gravenhorst, 1806
Stenus glacialis Heer, 1839
Stenus impressus Germar, 1824
Stenus longitarsis Skeetle Beetle
Stenus ludyi Fauvel, 1855
Stenus ochropus Kiesenwetter, 1858
Stenus ossium Stephens, 1833
Stenus pallipes Gravenhorst, 1802
Stenus palustris Erichson, 1839
Stenus subaeneus Erichson, 1840
Stenus cicindeloides (Schaller, 1783)
Stenus fornicatus Stephens, 1833
Stenus fulvicornis Stephens, 1833
Stenus kiesenwetteri Rosenhauer, 1856
Stenus latifrons Erichson, 1839
Stenus oscillator Rye, 1870
Stenus similis (Herbst, 1784)
Stenus solutus Erichson, 1840
Stenus tarsalis Ljungh, 1810
Metastenus bifoveolatus Gyllenhal, 1827
Metastenus binotatus Ljungh, 1804
Metastenus brevipennis C. G. Thomson, 1851
Metastenus butrintensis Smetana, 1959
Metastenus canescens Rosenhauer, 1856
Metastenus flavipes Stephens, 1833
Metastenus nitidiusculus Stephens, 1833
Metastenus niveus Fauvel, 1865
Metastenus pallitarsis Stephens, 1833
Metastenus picipennis Erichson, 1840
Metastenus picipes Stephens, 1833
Metastenus pubescens Stephens, 1833
Metastenus umbratilis Casey, 1884
Metastenus argus Gravenhorst, 1806
Metastenus asphaltinus Erichson, 1840
Metastenus assequens Rey, 1844
Metastenus ater Mannerheim, 1830
Metastenus atratulus Erichson, 1839
Metastenus biguttatus (Linnaeus, 1758)
Metastenus bimaculatus Gyllenhal, 1810
Metastenus boops Ljungh, 1810
Metastenus calcaratus Scriba, 1864
Metastenus canaliculatus Gyllenhal, 1827
Metastenus carbonarius Gyllenhal, 1827
Metastenus circularis Gravenhorst, 1802
Metastenus clavicornis (Scopoli, 1763)
Metastenus comma LeConte, 1863
Metastenus contumax Assing, 1994
Metastenus europaeus Puthz, 1966
Metastenus fossulatus Erichson, 1840
Metastenus fuscipes Gravenhorst, 1802
Metastenus glabellus C. G. Thomson, 1870
Metastenus guttula P. W. J. Müller, 1821
Metastenus guynemeri Jacquelin du Val, 1850
Metastenus incanus Erichson, 1839
Metastenus incrassatus Erichson, 1839
Metastenus juno (Paykull, 1789)
Metastenus longitarsis C. G. Thomson, 1851
Metastenus lustrator Erichson, 1839
Metastenus melanarius Stephens, 1833
Metastenus melanopus (Marsham, 1802)
Metastenus morio Gravenhorst, 1806
Metastenus nanus Stephens, 1833
Metastenus nitens Stephens, 1833
Metastenus palposus Zetterstedt, 1838
Metastenus proditor Erichson, 1839
Metastenus providus Erichson, 1839
Metastenus pusillus Stephens, 1833
Metastenus subdepressus Mulsant & Rey, 1861
Metastenus brunnipes Stephens, 1833
Metastenus crassus Stephens, 1833
Metastenus formicetorum Mannerheim, 1843
Metastenus nigritulus Gyllenhal, 1827
Metastenus opticus Gravenhorst, 1806
Euaesthetus bipunctatus (Ljungh, 1804)
Euaesthetus laeviusculus Mannerheim, 1844
Euaesthetus ruficapillus Lacordaire, 1835
Pseudopsis sulcata Newman, 1834
Achenium depressum (Gravenhorst, 1802)
Achenium humile (Nicolai, 1822)
Astenus procerus (Gravenhorst, 1806)
Astenus pulchellus (Heer, 1839)
Astenus serpentinus (Motschulsky, 1858)
Astenus immaculatus Stephens, 1833
Astenus lyonessius (Joy, 1908)
Hypomedon debilicornis (Wollaston, 1857)
Lathrobium brunnipes (Fabricius, 1793)
Lathrobium dilutum Erichson, 1839
Lathrobium elongatum (Linnaeus, 1767)
Lathrobium fovulum Stephens, 1833
Lathrobium fulvipenne (Gravenhorst, 1806)
Lathrobium geminum Kraatz, 1857
Lathrobium impressum Heer, 1841
Lathrobium longulum Gravenhorst, 1802
Lathrobium pallidipenne Hochhuth, 1851
Lathrobium pallidum Nordmann, 1837
Lathrobium rufipenne Gyllenhal, 1813
Lathrobium angusticolle Boisduval & Lacordaire, 1835
Lathrobium angustatum Boisduval & Lacordaire, 1835
Lathrobium quadratum (Paykull, 1789)
Lathrobium rufonitidum Reitter, 1909
Lathrobium terminatum Gravenhorst, 1802
Lathrobium zetterstedti Rye, 1872
Lithocharis nigriceps Kraatz, 1859
Lithocharis ochracea (Gravenhorst, 1802)
Lobrathium multipunctum (Gravenhorst, 1802)
Medon apicalis (Kraatz, 1857)
Medon brunneus (Erichson, 1839)
Medon castaneus (Gravenhorst, 1802)
Medon dilutus (Erichson, 1839)
Medon fusculus (Mannerheim, 1830)
Medon piceus (Kraatz, 1858)
Medon pocofer (Peyron, 1857)
Medon ripicola (Kraatz, 1854)
Ochthephilum collare (Reitter, 1884)
Ochthephilum fracticorne (Paykull, 1800)
Ochthephilum jacquelini (Boieldieu, 1859)
Paederidus rubrothoracicus (Goeze, 1777)
Paederus caligatus Erichson, 1840
Paederus fuscipes Curtis, 1826
Paederus littoralis Gravenhorst, 1802
Paederus riparius (Linnaeus, 1758)
Pseudomedon obscurellus (Erichson, 1840)
Pseudomedon obsoletus (Nordmann, 1837)
Rugilus angustatus Geoffroy, 1785)
Rugilus erichsoni (Fauvel, 1867)
Rugilus geniculatus (Erichson, 1839)
Rugilus orbiculatus (Paykull, 1789)
Rugilus rufipes Germar, 1836
Rugilus similis (Erichson, 1839)
Rugilus subtilis (Erichson, 1840)
Scopaeus gracilis (Sperk, 1835)
Scopaeus laevigatus (Gyllenhal, 1827)
Scopaeus minutus Erichson, 1840
Scopaeus ryei Wollaston, 1872
Scopaeus sulcicollis (Stephens, 1833)
Sunius bicolor (Olivier, 1795)
Sunius melanocephalus (Fabricius, 1793)
Sunius propinquus (Brisout, 1867)
Atrecus affinis (Paykull, 1789)
Othius angustus Stephens, 1833
Othius laeviusculus Stephens, 1833
Othius lapidicola Märkel & Kiesenwetter, 1848
Othius punctulatus (Goeze, 1777)
Othius subuliformis Stephens, 1833
Bisnius cephalotes (Gravenhorst, 1802)
Bisnius fimetarius (Gravenhorst, 1802)
Bisnius nigriventris (C. G. Thomson, 1867)
Bisnius parcus (Sharp, 1874)
Bisnius pseudoparcus (Brunne, 1976)
Bisnius puella (Nordmann, 1837)
Bisnius scoticus (Joy & Tomlin, 1913)
Bisnius sordidus (Gravenhorst, 1802)
Bisnius subuliformis (Gravenhorst, 1802)
Cafius cicatricosus (Erichson, 1840)
Cafius fucicola Curtis, 1830
Cafius xantholoma (Gravenhorst, 1806)
Erichsonius cinerascens (Gravenhorst, 1802)
Erichsonius signaticornis (Mulsant & Rey, 1852)
Erichsonius ytenensis (Sharp, 1913)
Gabrius appendiculatus Sharp, 1910
Gabrius astutoides (A. Strand, 1946)
Gabrius bishopi Sharp, 1910
Gabrius breviventer (Sperk, 1835)
Gabrius exiguus (Nordmann, 1837)
Gabrius keysianus Sharp, 1910
Gabrius nigritulus (Gravenhorst, 1802)
Gabrius osseticus (Kolenati, 1846)
Gabrius piliger Mulsant & Rey, 1876
Gabrius splendidulus (Gravenhorst, 1802)
Gabrius trossulus (Nordmann, 1837)
Gabrius velox Sharp, 1910
Gabronthus thermarum (Aubé, 1850)
Neobisnius lathrobioides (Baudi, 1848)
Neobisnius procerulus (Gravenhorst, 1806)
Neobisnius prolixus (Erichson, 1840)
Neobisnius villosulus (Stephens, 1833)
Philonthus addendus Sharp, 1867
Philonthus albipes (Gravenhorst, 1802)
Philonthus atratus (Gravenhorst, 1802)
Philonthus carbonarius (Gravenhorst, 1802)
Philonthus cognatus Stephens, 1832
Philonthus concinnus (Gravenhorst, 1802)
Philonthus confinis A. Strand, 1941
Philonthus coprophilus Jarrige, 1949
Philonthus corruscus (Gravenhorst, 1802)
Philonthus corvinus Erichson, 1839
Philonthus cruentatus (Gmelin in Linnaeus, 1790)
Philonthus debilis (Gravenhorst, 1802)
Philonthus decorus (Gravenhorst, 1802)
Philonthus dimidiatipennis Erichson, 1840
Philonthus discoideus (Gravenhorst, 1802)
Philonthus ebeninus (Gravenhorst, 1802)
Philonthus fumarius (Gravenhorst, 1806)
Philonthus furcifer Renkonen, 1937
Philonthus intermedius (Lacordaire, 1835)
Philonthus jurgans Tottenham, 1937
Philonthus laminatus (Creutzer, 1799)
Philonthus lepidus (Gravenhorst, 1802)
Philonthus longicornis Stephens, 1832
Philonthus mannerheimi Fauvel, 1869
Philonthus marginatus (O. F. Müller, 1764)
Philonthus micans (Gravenhorst, 1802)
Philonthus micantoides Benick & Lohse, 1956
Philonthus nigrita (Gravenhorst, 1806)
Philonthus nitidicollis (Boisduval & Lacordaire, 1835)
Philonthus parvicornis (Gravenhorst, 1802)
Philonthus politus (Linnaeus, 1758)
Philonthus punctus (Gravenhorst, 1802)
Philonthus quisquiliarius (Gyllenhal, 1810)
Philonthus rectangulus Sharp, 1874
Philonthus rotundicollis (Ménétriés, 1832)
Philonthus rubripennis Stephens, 1832
Philonthus rufipes (Stephens, 1832)
Philonthus sanguinolentus (Gravenhorst, 1802)
Philonthus spinipes Sharp, 1874
Philonthus splendens (Fabricius, 1793)
Philonthus succicola C. G. Thomson, 1860
Philonthus tenuicornis Mulsant & Rey, 1853
Philonthus umbratilis (Gravenhorst, 1802)
Philonthus varians (Paykull, 1789)
Philonthus ventralis (Gravenhorst, 1802)
Rabigus pullus (Nordmann, 1837)
Remus sericeus Holme, 1837
Acylophorus glaberrimus (Herbst, 1784)
Astrapaeus ulmi (Rossi, 1790)
Euryporus picipes (Paykull, 1800)
Heterothops binotatus (Gravenhorst, 1802)
Heterothops dissimilis (Gravenhorst, 1802)
Heterothops minutus Wollaston, 1860
Heterothops niger Kraatz, 1868
Heterothops praevius Erichson, 1839
Quedius cinctus (Paykull, 1790)
Quedius aetolicus Kraatz, 1858
Quedius brevicornis (C. G. Thomson, 1860)
Quedius brevis Erichson, 1840
Quedius cruentus (Olivier, 1795)
Quedius fulgidus (Fabricius, 1793)
Quedius invreae Gridelli, 1924
Quedius lateralis (Gravenhorst, 1802)
Quedius longicornis Kraatz, 1857
Quedius maurus (C. R. Sahlberg, 1830)
Quedius mesomelinus (Marsham, 1802)
Quedius microps J. L. C. Gravenhorst, 1847
Quedius nigrocaeruleus Fauvel, 1874
Quedius puncticollis (C. G. Thomson, 1867)
Quedius scitus (Gravenhorst, 1806)
Quedius truncicola Fairmaire & Laboulbène, 1856
Quedius xanthopus Erichson, 1839
Quedius plagiatus Mannerheim, 1843
Quedius balticus Korge, 1960
Quedius curtipennis Bernhauer, 1908
Quedius fuliginosus (Gravenhorst, 1802)
Quedius levicollis (Brullé, 1832)
Quedius molochinus (Gravenhorst, 1806)
Quedius simplicifrons Fairmaire, 1861
Quedius auricomus Kiesenwetter, 1850
Quedius boopoides Munster, 1923
Quedius boops (Gravenhorst, 1802)
Quedius fulvicollis (Stephens, 1833)
Quedius fumatus (Stephens, 1833)
Quedius humeralis Stephens, 1832
Quedius maurorufus (Gravenhorst, 1806)
Quedius nemoralis Baudi, 1848
Quedius nigriceps Kraatz, 1857
Quedius nitipennis (Stephens, 1833)
Quedius persimilis Mulsant & Rey, 1876
Quedius picipes (Mannerheim, 1830)
Quedius plancus Erichson, 1840
Quedius riparius Kellner, 1843
Quedius schatzmayri Gridelli, 1922
Quedius scintillans (Gravenhorst, 1806)
Quedius semiaeneus (Stephens, 1833)
Quedius semiobscurus (Marsham, 1802)
Quedius umbrinus Erichson, 1839
Velleius dilatatus (Fabricius, 1787)
Creophilus maxillosus (Linnaeus, 1758)
Dinothenarus pubescens (De Geer, 1774)
Emus hirtus (Linnaeus, 17588)
Ocypus brunnipes (Fabricius, 1781)
Ocypus nitens (Schrank, 1781)
Ocypus olens (O. F. Müller, 1764)
Ocypus ophthalmicus (Scopoli, 1763)
Ocypus aeneocephalus (De Geer, 1774)
Ocypus fortunatarum (Wollaston, 1871)
Ocypus fuscatus (Gravenhorst, 1802)
Ontholestes murinus (Linnaeus, 1758)
Ontholestes tessellatus (Geoffroy, 1785)
Platydracus fulvipes (Scopoli, 1763)
Platydracus latebricola (Gravenhorst, 1806)
Platydracus stercorarius (Olivier, 1795)
Staphylinus caesareus Cederhjelm, 1798
Staphylinus dimidiaticornis Gemminger, 1851
Staphylinus erythropterus Linnaeus, 1758
Tasgius globulifer (Geoffroy, 1785)
Tasgius melanarius (Heer, 1839)
Tasgius morsitans (Rossi, 1790)
Tasgius winkleri Bernhauer, 1906
Tasgius ater (Gravenhorst, 1802)
Tasgius pedator (Gravenhorst, 1802)
Gauropterus fulgidus (Fabricius, 1787)
Gyrohypnus angustatus Stephens, 1833
Gyrohypnus atratus (Heer, 1839)
Gyrohypnus fracticornis (O. F. Müller, 1776)
Gyrohypnus punctulatus (Paykull, 1789)
Hypnogyra angularis Ganglbauer, 1895
Leptacinus batychrus (Gyllenhal, 1827)
Leptacinus formicetorum Märkel, 1841
Leptacinus intermedius Donisthorpe, 1936
Leptacinus pusillus (Stephens, 1833)
Megalinus glabratus (Gravenhorst, 1802)
Nudobius lentus (Gravenhorst, 1806)
Phacophallus parumpunctatus (Gyllenhal, 1827)
Phacophallus pallidipennis (Motschulsky, 1858)
Xantholinus laevigatus Jacobsen, 1849
Xantholinus elegans (Olivier, 1795)
Xantholinus tricolor (Fabricius, 1787)
Xantholinus gallicus Coiffait, 1956
Xantholinus linearis (Olivier, 1795)
Xantholinus longiventris Heer, 1839

References

Rove beetles
Articles containing video clips